April is a 1998 Italian semi-autobiographical film directed by Nanni Moretti. Moretti also played the central character, a filmmaker who has to deal with Italy's political situation, his own goals as an artist and becoming a father.

The French director Claire Denis described the film thus, "He wants to make a musical comedy but he can't get started. So instead he talks about his life, his new baby, his desires and fears. Finally in the very last scene he begins."

Moretti's wife, son and mother appear as themselves.

Plot
Following the general election of 1994, won by the centre-right coalition led by Silvio Berlusconi, Moretti is encouraged by a journalist friend to make a documentary about the current political situation in Italy. Two years pass, another election is held, and Moretti has still made no progress with his documentary. He begins shooting another project, alluded to in Dear Diary, a musical about a Trotskyist pastry chef set in the 1950s, but he becomes disillusioned and is distracted by his wife Silvia's pregnancy, which preoccupies him more and more. His son Pietro is born, and the centre-left coalition Ulivo wins the election. Moretti continues to try to shoot his documentary in Venice and Apulia, but the film is never finished. On his 44th birthday he realises that he must stop hesitating and he finally begins shooting his musical in earnest.

Cast
 Nanni Moretti as himself
 Silvio Orlando as himself
 Silvia Nono as herself
 Pietro Moretti as himself
 Agata Apicella Moretti as herself
 Nuria Schoenberg as herself
  as herself
 Quentin de Fouchécour as himself
 Renato De Maria as himself
 Claudio Francia as himself
 Jacopo Francia as himself
 Matilde Francia as herself
 Daniele Luchetti as himself
 Giovanna Nicolai as herself
  as himself

Awards
 David di Donatello 1998: Best Supporting Actor (Silvio Orlando)
 Cannes Film Festival Palme d'Or (nominated)

References

External links
 

1990s political comedy films
1998 films
Films directed by Nanni Moretti
1990s Italian-language films
Italian political comedy films
Self-reflexive films
Films scored by Ludovico Einaudi
Films set in Rome
1998 comedy films
1990s Italian films